Oontomyces is a genus of anaerobic fungi isolated from the digestive tract of Indian camel.

References

Neocallimastigomycota